Scott Taylor (born 1960) is a former soldier (3 years in the infantry) Canadian journalist, writer and publisher who specializes in military journalism and war reporting. His coverage has included wars in Cambodia, Africa, the Persian Gulf, Turkey, South Ossetia, the Balkans, Afghanistan, Iraq, and Libya. Scott Taylor is also a former private in the Canadian Forces, PPCLI.  He has worked as the editor and publisher of Esprit de Corps, since 1988.

Taylor has aroused a certain amount of controversy during his career; described as "fiercely opinionated", his articles have attracted criticism for their often strongly polemical slant. He has been critical of the Canadian Forces and the Department of National Defence, and has also written in opposition to Western involvement in the Kosovo War, Iraq War and the Libyan Civil War. Taylor has won Press TV's  ' Unembedded Journalist of the Year' Award for 2008.

Taylor is a regular op-ed contributor to the Halifax Herald newspaper, as well as the Embassy Magazine. He has also contributed to such publications as the Ottawa Citizen, 'Maclean’s magazine, The Globe and Mail, the Toronto Sun, Reader's Digest and the Global television network. He has also appeared in several international journals such as Indian Defense Review, Mayar Nemzet and Al Jazeera. In 2006, Scott Taylor presented to the University of Western Ontario his Clissold Lecture titled From Belgrade to Baghdad.  Taylor appears regularly in Canadian media as a military expert and analyst. In 1996 he received the Quill Award, as well as the Alexander MacKenzie Award for journalistic excellence.

In 2004, Taylor and a Turkish colleague Zeynep Tugrul were kidnapped in Iraq by Ansar al-Islam, a radical Islamist group and held for five days. His release generated a wave of international media coverage and he returned to Iraq in 2005, briefing the U.S soldiers stationed there on the Turkmen people of Iraq.

Early years of Esprit de Corps

Scott Taylor's Canadian military magazine, Esprit de Corps, was first conceived of as an in-flight magazine for the Canadian Air Force, after Scott Taylor and his wife Katherine Taylor discovered that Canadian Air Force planes lacked any on-board entertainment system or reading material. Their original concept was to utilize the military passengers who normally used the airlines to attract advertisers who wished to promote their products to Canadian Forces personnel.

After struggling to have his proposal accepted by the Canadian Forces, Scott Taylor was able to secure national advertisers for the publication; corporations who had large budgets and could afford to advertise in their magazine. Esprit de Corps was first published as an illustration oriented magazine, with small articles and more entertainment oriented content.

Due to the collapse of the Soviet Union and the Canadian government’s subsequent downsizing of its military expenditure, the Canadian Forces were experiencing cutbacks and changing the way in which its personnel would be transported. This affected Esprit de Corps drastically, as Canadian Forces personnel would now be transported via flights chartered by Air Canada. Because of the loss of its Canadian Air Force distribution and the cost-cutting atmosphere of the military community, Scott Taylor and his wife decided to convert their magazine to a newsstand monthly.

The new magazine would feature mainly current military news and Canadian military history. The magazine continued to retain its seat-back distribution with Air Canada military charters and Scott Taylor began to hire staff in order to help fill their new eighty-four page format.

In 1991, Esprit de Corps ran a controversial article, in which they interviewed the recently resigned vice-Admiral Chuck Thomas, recognizing and supporting Thomas, who had claimed that the Canadian Forces were not properly prepared for the future. As a result, the Department of National Defence ordered Air Canada to cease distribution of Esprit de Corps aboard their military charter flights. The DND’s decision was later reversed when Scott Taylor threatened to issue a press release detailing corruption involving the DND official magazine Canadian Defence Quarterly.

2004 Kidnapping and Release

On September 7, 2004, Scott Taylor and Turkish journalist Zeynep Tugrul, who works for the Turkish newspaper Sabah, arrived in Iraq to report on the Invasion of Iraq by the United States Military. Their reporting brought them to the city of Tal Afar in the predominantly Turkmen North, where the U.S was on the verge of major action against mujahedeen fighters. At a quarter past 7:00 on September 7, Taylor and Zeynep met with an Iraqi police checkpoint, planning to get directions to their contact in Tal Afar, Doctor Jashar. They were directed to a waiting car filled with masked gunmen, whom they believed to be Iraqi Special Forces.

They were driven by the masked gunmen to a resistance safe house, where they were kidnapped by Ansar al-Islam, a radical Islamist group and accused of being spies. Scott and Zeynep were held captive for five days by the Mujahedeen in which they were transported to numerous resistance sites, tortured for information, threatened with execution and continually beaten.

On September 12, Mujahedeen agents threw Scott Taylor into an awaiting cab in northern Iraq with next to no money and abruptly released him, having negotiated a release with the Iraqi Turkmen Front and Zeynep Tugrul, who had been released earlier. His release created a wave of international media attention, granting him interviews in which he told the story of his kidnapping.

Family

Scott Taylor currently lives in Ottawa, Ontario with wife Katherine Taylor and son Kirk Taylor. He works at Esprit de Corps office as the publisher. He also plays for the Esprit de Corps Commando's hockey team as a right winger.

Books

Scott Taylor has  authored several books during his career:

 
Scott Taylor has also starred in and been the subject of several documentaries:

Documentaries

References

External links

Scott Taylor bio

1960 births
Living people
Canadian newspaper reporters and correspondents
Canadian war correspondents
Place of birth missing (living people)
War correspondents of the Yugoslav Wars